Archibald Taylor may refer to:

Archibald Taylor House, Franklin County, North Carolina
Archibald Taylor Plantation House, Granville County, North Carolina
Archibald Taylor (cricketer) (born 1941), New Zealand cricketer

See also
Taylor Archibald
Archie Taylor (disambiguation)